Philotheca falcata, commonly known as the sickle-leaved waxflower, is a species of flowering plant in the family Rutaceae and is endemic to a small area in the south-west of Western Australia. It is a small, densely-branched shrub with narrow club-shaped leaves and single flowers on the ends of branchlets.

Description
The ten hairy stamens are free from each other and the style is glabrous. Flowering has been recorded in October.

Taxonomy and naming
This philotheca was first formally described in 1970 by Paul Wilson who gave it the name Eriostemon falcatus and published the description in the journal Nuytsia from specimens collected by William Blackall near  Yellowdine in 1931. In 1998, Wilson changed the name to Philotheca falcata in the same journal.

Distribution and habitat
The only known specimens of Philotheca falcata were growing in woodland near Southern Cross and near Holleton.

Conservation status
This species is classified as "critically endangered" under the Australian Government Environment Protection and Biodiversity Conservation Act 1999 and as Threatened Flora (Declared Rare Flora — Extant)" by the Department of Environment and Conservation (Western Australia). The main threat to the species is habitat alteration caused by land clearing.

References

falcata
Flora of Western Australia
Sapindales of Australia
Plants described in 1970
Taxa named by Paul G. Wilson